Sanford Dam could refer to: 

Sanford Dam, a dam on the Canadian River at Sanford, Texas, that formed Lake Meredith
Sanford Dam, a dam on the Tittabawassee River near Sanford, Michigan, that formed Sanford Lake